Anthony of Sourozh (secular name Andrei Borisovich Bloom,  and commonly known as Anthony Bloom; 19 June 1914 – 4 August 2003) was best known as a writer and broadcaster on prayer and the Christian life. He was a monk and bishop of the Russian Orthodox Church. He was founder and for many years bishop - then archbishop, then metropolitan - of the Diocese of Sourozh, the Patriarchate of Moscow's diocese for Great Britain and Ireland (the name 'Sourozh' is that of the historical episcopal see in Sudak in the Crimea). As a bishop he became well known as a pastor, preacher, spiritual director and writer on prayer and the Christian life.

Early life
Andrei Bloom was born on 19 June 1914, in Lausanne, Switzerland, to Xenia and Boris Edvardovich Bloom. His mother was the half sister of the composer Alexander Scriabin.

He spent his early childhood in Russia and Iran. During the Russian Revolution the family had to leave Iran, and by 1923 they were settled in Paris, where he was educated. He graduated in physics, chemistry and biology, and took his doctorate in medicine at the University of Paris.

By his own words, he met Christ, when he was a teenager:
"I met Christ as a Person at a moment when I needed him in order to live, and at a moment when I was not in search of him. I was found; I did not find him".

"I was a teenager then. Life had been difficult in the early years and now it had of a sudden become easier. All the years when life had been hard I had found it natural, if not easy, to fight; but when life became easy and happy I was faced quite unexpectedly with a problem: I could not accept aimless happiness. Hardships and suffering had to be overcome, there was something beyond them. Happiness seemed to be stale if it had no further meaning".

"As it often happens when you are young and when you act with passion, bent to possess either everything or nothing, I decided that I would give myself a year to see whether life had a meaning, and if I discovered it had none I would not live beyond the year..."--

Career
In 1939, before leaving for the front as a surgeon in the French Army, he secretly professed monastic vows in the Russian Orthodox Church. In 1943 he was tonsured and received the name of Antony. During the occupation of France by Nazi Germany he worked as a doctor, and took part in the French Resistance.

After the war he continued practising as a physician until 1948, when he was ordained to the presbyterate and sent to Britain to serve as Orthodox Christian chaplain of the Fellowship of Saint Alban and Saint Sergius, a society established to foster understanding and friendship between the Russian Orthodox and Anglican churches. In 1950 he was appointed vicar of the Russian Patriarchal parish in London.

In 1957 he was consecrated as bishop, and as archbishop in 1962 in charge of the Russian Orthodox Diocese of Sourozh.

In 1963 he was appointed exarch of the Moscow Patriarchate in Western Europe, and in 1966 was assigned the rank of metropolitan bishop.

In 1974 by mutual agreement he was released from the function of exarch, in order to devote himself more fully to the pastoral needs of the growing flock of his diocese. Between 1966 and 1986 he brought out six books on prayer.

In mid 2003, Bloom resigned as diocesan bishop. He died on 4 August 2003. His grave in the Brompton Cemetery, London, is visited by Christians and many others.

Honours
Bloom received honorary doctorates from the University of Aberdeen ("for preaching the Word of God and renewing the spiritual life of this country"); from the Moscow Theological Academy for his theological, pastoral and preaching work; from the University of Cambridge; and from the Kiev Theological Academy.

Writings
His books were published in English in Britain. His texts were subsequently widely published in Russia as books and in periodicals.
Note: dates are for British editions.
Publications 
1966 – Living Prayer
1970 – School for Prayer
1970 – Beginning to Pray (re-publishing of School for Prayer)
1971 – God and man
1972 – Meditations on a Theme: a spiritual journey
1973 – Courage to Pray
1986 – The Essence of Prayer (Contains Living Prayer, School for Prayer, God and Man, and Courage to Pray)

Posthumously published works
2005 – Encounter
2007 – The Living Body of Christ
2009 – Coming Closer to Christ: on Confession
2017 – Churchianity vs. Christianity

Posthumous works

The Metropolitan Anthony of Sourozh Foundation is a body of independent trustees who collect together and publish his writings. As of July 2011, the foundation undertakes this by managing the copyrights in his works and by commissioning new selections and approved translations.

The foundation is also establishing the official archive of Bloom's papers and writings, together with related materials such as recordings of talks, broadcasts and sermons.

The foundation is the legal owner of the worldwide copyrights and other intellectual property rights in Bloom's works. Its charity registered number is 1120395 and the chairman of the trustees is Protodeacon Peter Scorer.

References

Further reading
 G. Crow, This Holy Man: Impressions of Metropolitan Anthony (2005).

External links
The Metropolitan Anthony of Sourozh Foundation (old website)
The Metropolitan Anthony of Sourozh Foundation (new website)
Russian Orthodox Diocese of Sourozh
The Deanery of Orthodox Parishes of Russian Tradition in Great Britain and Ireland
Metropolitan Anthony of Sourozh (English)
Funeral of Metropolitan Anthony of Sourozh
Metropolitan Anthony of Sourozh Archive: Photos, Video, Audio, and Texts
Obituary in The Guardian

1914 births
2003 deaths
People from Lausanne
Bishops of the Russian Orthodox Church
Eastern Orthodox missionaries
Burials at Brompton Cemetery
French military doctors
French Resistance members
Eastern Orthodox Christians from France
Eastern Orthodox theologians
Eastern Orthodox Christians from the United Kingdom
Emigrants from the Russian Empire to Iran
Emigrants from the Russian Empire to France
French Army personnel of World War II
French Army officers